The Mirror and the Light is a play by Hilary Mantel and Ben Miles based on Mantel's 2020 book of the same name. It is the third part to Wolf Hall Parts One & Two which is a double-bill play based on Mantel's novels Wolf Hall and Bring Up the Bodies.

Production 
Following the award-winning West End and Broadway productions of Wolf Hall Parts One & Two, the play is produced by the Royal Shakespeare Company (with Playful Productions) and opened in London's West End at the Gielgud Theatre from 23 September running until 28 November 2021. Co-adapter Ben Miles will reprise his role as Thomas Cromwell with Nathaniel Parker reprising his role Henry VIII. The play is directed by Jeremy Herrin, designed by Christopher Oram with music by Stephen Warbeck. On 22 July 2021 further casting was announced.

Characters and original cast

External links 

 Official website

See also 

 Cultural depictions of Henry VIII of England
Wolf Hall Parts One & Two - a 2013 two-part stage adaptation of the first two parts of Mantel's trilogy

References 

2021 plays
West End plays
Plays based on real people
Plays about British royalty
Plays set in England
Cultural depictions of Henry VIII